Rômulo Marques Antoneli or simply Rômulo (born 25 February 1982) is a Brazilian former professional footballer who played as a forward.

Career
Rômulo was born in Inhaúmas-GO, Brazil.

After weeks of speculation, where it was thought that he might even go to Deportivo de La Coruña, Cruzeiro produced a bid twice as high as Grêmio's for the player. He did eventually move to Cruzeiro, but Cruzeiro later loaned him out to Beitar Jerusalem in August 2007 for one year. Rômulo joined the French Ligue 2 club RC Strasbourg on a six-month loan from Cruzeiro, on 8 September 2009 Coritiba signed the forward on loan from Cruzeiro until December 2009. When the loan ended, he was transferred to Atlas of Mexico. After spending six months in Mexico, he returned to his home country Brazil and joined Guarani. Then, he moved to Grêmio Prudente from Guarani in January 2011. On 29 June 2011, Rômulo joined Belgian side Westerlo from Brasiliense, signing a one-year contract. But after just over two months at Belgium side, he moved to Israeli club Ironi Nir Ramat HaSharon. In July 2013, he joined Maltese club Valletta on a one-year deal.

Honours

Club
 Goiás State League: 2002
 Brazilian League (3rd division): 2003
 Israeli Premier League: 2007–08
 Israel State Cup: 2007–08

Individual
 Goiás State League's top scorer: 2003

References

External links
 
 

1982 births
Living people
Brazilian footballers
Association football forwards
Grêmio Foot-Ball Porto Alegrense players
Botafogo de Futebol e Regatas players
Comercial Futebol Clube (Ribeirão Preto) players
Ituano FC players
1. FSV Mainz 05 players
Bundesliga players
Liga MX players
Beitar Jerusalem F.C. players
Hapoel Nir Ramat HaSharon F.C. players
Israeli Premier League players
Cruzeiro Esporte Clube players
Grêmio Barueri Futebol players
RC Strasbourg Alsace players
K.V.C. Westerlo players
Atlas F.C. footballers
Valletta F.C. players
Ligue 2 players
Belgian Pro League players
Brazilian expatriate footballers
Brazilian expatriate sportspeople in Germany
Expatriate footballers in Germany
Brazilian expatriate sportspeople in Israel
Expatriate footballers in Israel
Brazilian expatriate sportspeople in France
Expatriate footballers in France
Brazilian expatriate sportspeople in Mexico
Expatriate footballers in Mexico
Brazilian expatriate sportspeople in Belgium
Expatriate footballers in Belgium
Brazilian expatriate sportspeople in Malta
Expatriate footballers in Malta
Brazilian people of Italian descent